is a Japanese former cyclist. He competed in the individual road race event at the 1984 Summer Olympics. He also competed at the 1982 and 1986 Asian Games. He served as one of the coaches for the Japanese cycling team at the 2012 Summer Olympics.

References

External links
 

1955 births
Living people
Japanese male cyclists
Olympic cyclists of Japan
Cyclists at the 1984 Summer Olympics
Sportspeople from Akita Prefecture
Japanese Olympic coaches
Asian Games medalists in cycling
Cyclists at the 1982 Asian Games
Cyclists at the 1986 Asian Games
Asian Games silver medalists for Japan
Medalists at the 1982 Asian Games
Medalists at the 1986 Asian Games